Ade Capone (26 December 1958, in Piacenza – 4 February 2015, in Salsomaggiore Terme), was an  Italian comic book writer.  He is perhaps best known for having written many stories for the comic book Zagor and as the creator of the comic book Lazarus Ledd.

Works
Zagor # 263, 264, 265, 289, 290, 291, 294, 295, 296, 307, 308, 309, 310, 316, 325, 326, 327, 330, 331, 501, 502, 503, 519, 520, 521, Maxi 7, Maxi12, Maxi 19
Mister No #128, 129, 130
Martin Mystere #126, 127

External links
 Collaboratori Zagor on Sergio Bonelli Editore (Italian)

1958 births
Italian comics writers
2015 deaths